Mercury Bluff is a perpendicular bluff on Gerlovo Beach in the northwest of Ioannes Paulus II Peninsula, Livingston Island in the South Shetland Islands, Antarctica.  The area was visited by early 19th century sealers.

The feature is named after the British sealing ship Mercury under Captain Robert Wetherell that operated out of the nearby Shirreff Cove in 1820–21.

Location

Maps
 L.L. Ivanov et al. Antarctica: Livingston Island and Greenwich Island, South Shetland Islands. Scale 1:100000 topographic map. Sofia: Antarctic Place-names Commission of Bulgaria, 2005.
 L.L. Ivanov. Antarctica: Livingston Island and Greenwich, Robert, Snow and Smith Islands. Scale 1:120000 topographic map.  Troyan: Manfred Wörner Foundation, 2009.

References
 SCAR Composite Antarctic Gazetteer.

Cliffs of Livingston Island